The 1954 Men's World Weightlifting Championships were held in Vienna, Austria from October 7 to October 10, 1954. There were 100 men in action from 23 nations.

Medal summary

Medal table

References
Results (Sport 123)
Weightlifting World Championships Seniors Statistics

External links
International Weightlifting Federation

World Weightlifting Championships
World Weightlifting Championships
World Weightlifting Championships
International weightlifting competitions hosted by Austria